Cameron McIntyre (born 3 June 1981) is a rugby union player who played for Canterbury in the Air New Zealand Cup and for the Crusaders in Super Rugby. His time spent at Canterbury and the Crusaders saw him keep Andrew Mehrtens on the bench with Dan Carter playing inside centre. His club rugby team is Marist/Albion in the Christchurch premier competition to which he captained them to a club championship. In 2006 he was part of the Junior All Black team that won the Pacific Cup and was named player of the tournament. 

After the New Zealand 2006 season finished he moved offshore to France where he played 125 Top 14 games for Castres in the French Top 14. He then moved to Japan and played for Toyota and NEC in the Japanese Top League His position is fly-half and inside centre and was a prodigious goal kicker. 

He is the great nephew of former All Blacks Bob Stuart & Kevin Stuart.

He has been playing at fullback and 10 for Canterbury in the ITM Cup in 2015.

One of the more unluckier players of his time not to be capped for the All Blacks. 

He is now a top-level Player Agent for esportif and looks after many of NZ Rugby's top talents and most promising Players.

External links
 Profile on CRFU site
 Crusaders profile

1981 births
Living people
Canterbury rugby union players
Castres Olympique players
Crusaders (rugby union) players
Expatriate rugby union players in France
Expatriate rugby union players in Japan
Highlanders (rugby union) players
Green Rockets Tokatsu players
New Zealand expatriate rugby union players
New Zealand expatriate sportspeople in France
New Zealand expatriate sportspeople in Japan
New Zealand rugby union players
Rugby union players from Christchurch
Rugby union fly-halves
Toyota Verblitz players